The 1998 Louisville Cardinals football team represented the University of Louisville in the 1998 NCAA Division I-A football season. The team was led by John L. Smith and played their home games in the newly completed Papa John's Cardinal Stadium. The team ended the season with a record of 7–5.

Schedule

Roster
2  RASHAD HOLMAN            DB
2  FRANK ZEBICH             PK
3  ANTONIO ROUNDTREE        DB
4  BRIAN GAINES             CB
4  STEVE VEENEMAN           PK
5  RAFAEL COOPER            RB
6  IBN GREEN                TE
7  CHRIS REDMAN   QB
8  CHARLES SHEFFIELD        WR
9  CASSWELL GOODMAN         LB
10  ARNOLD JACKSON   WR
11  MIKE WATKINS             QB
12  LAVELL BOYD              WR
13  GARY GUMM                QB
14  DAR-SHAY PURRY           S
15  DAVE RAGONE              QB
17  OTIS FLOYD               LB
18  JEFF BRUNELLI            QB
18  KAELEN MATTHEWS          P
19  COURTNEY DINKINS         S
20  BUD HERRING              LB
22  GREG BRANT               DB
23  JON HILBERT              K
24  JAGUAR SANDERS           CB
25  CALVIN HAMLER            S
26  LEROY COLLINS            RB
27  DON BIBB                 CB
28  DEWAYNE TAYLOR           S
29  JASON WYATT              LB
30  DAVID ASHBY              DB
32  FRANK MOREAU   RB
33  NATE BENNETT             PK
34  DEREK TRONZO             WR
35  MICHAEL BROWN            S
36  GARRET WILLIAMS          RB
36  KEVIN WARE               DB
37  RICO WILLIAMS            WR
38  JEREMY BORSETH   P
38  HERB YARBOURGH           DB
39  ADRIEL WALKER            DB
40  DAVID WASHINGTON         TE
41  XAVIER BURRELL           S
42  TONY STALLINGS           LB
44  HENRY MILLER             RB
45  BRETT SHIVELY            LB
46  ZACH BUTLER              DB
47  JEFF SHOLLY              TE
49  KLARENS JONES            S
50  CRAIG GOTCHER            LB
51  PJ ZARICZNY              C
52  RASHAD HARRIS            LB
53  JEREMY COLLINS           LB
54  DAN PARDUE               OL
55  ANDRE COLLINS            LB
57  ERIN SMITH               DE
58  TOBY DAWSON              DE
59  MATT SEXTON              DE
61  AARON DARDZINSKI         OL
62  JOSH RICHARDSON          OT
64  ANTOINE SIMS             OL
65  ANTHONY BYRD             OT
69  JON SUSKI                OL
70  RICK NORD                OL
71  MARK GRIVNA              OT
72  ARIEL RODRIGUEZ          OL
73  RYAN LUNDGARD            OL
74  MIKE GANTOUS             DT
75  GEOFF MCBARNETTE         OL
76  ROB EBLE                 OT
77  JOE OSHAUGHNESSY         OL
80  ZEK PARKER               WR
81  JASON JONES              TE
82  CHIP MATTLINGLY          TE
84  ALLEN CARROLL            WR
85  DAMION DORSEY            WR
86  BRIAN MCDONALD           WR
87  JUSTIN THOMAS            WR
89  NAT BINGHAM              WR
90  REGGIE HARGROVE          DE
91  BRAXTON ANDERSON         DT
92  MICHAEL JOSIAH           DE
93  ANTHONY BONNER           DT
94  JAMES DENNIS             DE
95  DEVON THOMAS             DE
96  DERRICK KENNEDY          DT
98  RANDY ZILKO              DE
99  GRANT JOHNSON            DT

References

Louisville
Louisville Cardinals football seasons
Louisville Cardinals football